Blue Mountain may refer to:

Mountains

Canada 
Blue Mountain (British Columbia), in the city of Coquitlam
Blue Mountain, Kings County, Nova Scotia
Blue Mountain, Pictou County, Nova Scotia

India 
Phawngpui, Mizoram, India, also known as Blue Mountain; home of Blue Mountain National Park
Nilgiri mountains of south India

Jamaica 
Blue Mountain Peak, in the Blue Mountains range

United States 
Blue Mountain (Arkansas)
Blue Mountain (California)
Blue Mountain (Missouri)
Blue Mountain (Montana), in Missoula
Blue Mountain (Nevada), near Winnemucca
Blue Mountain (New Jersey), a prominence of Kittatinny Mountain
Blue Mountain (New York)
Blue Mountain (Pennsylvania)
Blue Mountain (Washington), in Olympic National Park
West Blue Mountain (New Mexico)

Places

Settlements

Australia 
 Blue Mountain, Queensland, a locality in the Isaac Region
 Blue Mountain Heights, Queensland, a locality in the Toowoomba Region

United States 
Blue Mountain, Alabama, former town in the United States mostly annexed by Anniston, Alabama in 2003
Blue Mountain, Arkansas, town in the United States 
Blue Mountain, California, former settlement in the United States 
Blue Mountain, Mississippi, town in the United States 
Blue Mountain Lake (hamlet), New York, hamlet in the United States

Water bodies 
 Blue Mountain Lake (New York lake) a lake in the United States 
 Blue Mountain Lake (Arkansas), artificial lake in Arkansas, United States 
 Blue Mountain Creek, in New South Wales, Australia

Other places 
Blue Mountain (ski resort), a ski resort in Ontario, Canada
Blue Mountain Resort, a ski resort in Pennsylvania, United States 
Blue Mountain Formation, a geological formation in Ontario, Canada
Blue Mountain College, in Blue Mountain, Mississippi, United States

Music 
Blue Mountain (band), an alt-country musical group
Blue Mountain (Blue Mountain album), 1993
Blue Mountain (Brandon Heath album), 2012
Blue Mountain (Bob Weir album), 2016

Other uses
Blue Mountain Arts, a greeting card company founded by poet Susan Polis Schutz and physicist/illustrator Stephen Schutz in 1971
Blue Mountain, a logo used by Paramount Pictures and its companies
Blue Mountain Pottery, a Canadian company
Blue Mountain State, an American comedy series
ASCI Blue Mountain, decommissioned supercomputer at Los Alamos National Laboratory
Jamaican Blue Mountain Coffee
Blue Mountain (film), a 1997 Swiss film

See also
Blue Mountains (disambiguation)
Blue Ridge (disambiguation)
Mount Blue (disambiguation)